"Moonlighting" is the theme song to the ABC comedy-crime drama of the same name, which ran from 1985 to 1989 and starred Bruce Willis and Cybill Shepherd. The theme song was performed by Al Jarreau, who wrote the song with Lee Holdridge; it was produced by Nile Rodgers. The song was included on the soundtrack album for the series. The song also appears on Jarreau's 1996 compilation album The Best of Al Jarreau.

The theme from "Moonlighting" was released as a single in 1987, where it reached number 23 on the Billboard Hot 100 and spent one week at number one on the Adult Contemporary chart.

Charts

Awards
In 1988 the song earned two Grammy Award nominations for Best Pop Vocal Performance, Male and for Best Song Written Specifically for a Motion Picture or Television.

Track listing 
 Moonlighting "Theme" (Extended Remix) - Al Jarreau, Lee Holdridge - 4:17
 Moonlighting "Theme" (7" Version) -  Al Jarreau, Lee Holdridge - 3:01
 Golden Girl - Jimmy Felber - 5:50

References

1987 singles
Comedy television theme songs
Al Jarreau songs
Songs with music by Lee Holdridge
Song recordings produced by Nile Rodgers